Oreocereus trollii, commonly known as the Old Man of the Andes cactus, is a species of cacti native to Argentina and Bolivia. Named after Wilhelm Troll, its common name comes from the abundant white hairs surrounding the plant which serve to protect it from scorching sunlight and frosts in its mountain habitat. Slow growing, O. trollii produces red flowers, typically after reaching several feet in height. Though listed as Least Concern by the IUCN, the plant is collected extensively, and in some areas is threatened.

References

External links

Cacti of South America
Flora of Bolivia
Flora of Argentina
Trichocereeae
Plants described in 1929